Saint-Placide may refer to:
 Saint-Placide, Quebec
 Saint-Placide (Paris Metro)
 Saint Placidus